VH-4 (Rescue Squadron 4) was one of six dedicated (VH) Rescue Squadrons of the U.S. Navy during WWII. A more comprehensive write-up on the VH squadrons can be found in the history of Rescue Squadron 3 (VH-3), which was the US Navy's most active VH squadron. VH-4 made 42 rescues of downed aviators, 9 rescues of Filipino civilians, and assisted in the rescue of another aviator.  VH-4 was established in September 1944 and disestablished in November1946. The squadron employed the Martin PBM Mariner during its operations.

Operational history 
 September 1944: VH-4 was established at NAS San Diego, California..
 March 1945: VH-4 commences operations in support of Invasion of Luzon in the Philippines. 7 survivors from 2 downed planes are rescued. An additional 9 Filipino women survivors from a capsized outrigger are rescued.
 22 April 1945: Lt Norvell of VH-4 rescues 5 survivors from a downed B-25 off of Formosa.
 June 1945: VH-4 relocates to Okinawa to join Rescue Squadron VH-3, which has been there since April.  In the last two months of the war,  VH-4 makes 30 rescues of downed aviators and assists in the rescue of another.
 4 September 1945: VH-4 moved to Tokyo Bay.
 October 1945: VH-4 moved to new seadrome at Sasebo, Nagasaki.
 1 March 1945: VH-4 detached to task force participating in Operation Crossroads atomic tests.
 November 1946: VH-4 was disestablished.

See also 
 VH-3 (Rescue squadron)
 VH-4 squadron [1]
 VH squadrons [2]
 USS Gardiners Bay (AVP-39)
 USS Suisun
 USS Pine Island (AV-12)
 USS Bering Strait (AVP-34)
 USS Orca (AVP-49)
 Dumbo (air-sea rescue)
 Seaplane tender
 Flying boat
 Air-sea rescue
 List of inactive United States Navy aircraft squadrons

References 

Rescue squadrons of the United States Navy